Mohamad Rakip (born 14 May 2000) is an Indian professional footballer who plays as a defender for Indian Super League club East Bengal. He also represented India at the FIFA U-17 World Cup in 2017.

Club career

Early career
Rakip is a product of AIFF Elite Academy. In 2016 he was selected to play for the Indian Arrows, a team consisting of Indian under 17 players. Rakip was shortlisted in the probable list for the 2017 FIFA Under 17 World Cup, but didn't make it to the final squad.

Kerala Blasters
In 2017, Rakip became the first Indian U17 player to sign for an Indian Super League. He was first put into the reserve team of the Blasters and played in 8 games for the club with I-League 2nd Division. After an impressive performance there, he was promoted into the senior side in 2018. He made his debut for the club against ATK on 29 October 2019, which ended 2–1 in favour for the Blasters. He totally made 11 appearances  for the club during that season. After making 15 appearances for the blasters during the 2019–20 Indian Super League season, it was rumoured that Rakip did not want to sign a contract extension with the Blasters as he had offers from other ISL sides.

Mumbai City FC
On 20 October 2020, Mumbai City FC announced that they have signed Rakip on a two-year deal. He made his debut for the club on 25 November 2020 against FC Goa. In March 2022, he was included in club's 2022 AFC Champions League squad.

Career statistics

Club

References

External sources

2000 births
Living people
Indian footballers
Footballers from Manipur
Association football defenders
Indian Super League players
Mumbai City FC players
Kerala Blasters FC players
Indian Arrows players
I-League players
I-League 2nd Division players
AIFF Elite Academy players
Kerala Blasters FC Reserves and Academy players